Westminster is a census-designated place (CDP) in East Baton Rouge Parish, Louisiana, United States. The population was 3,008 at the 2010 census, up from 2,515 in 2000. It is part of the Baton Rouge Metropolitan Statistical Area.

It is in the proposed City of St. George.

Geography
Westminster is located in south-central East Baton Rouge Parish at  (30.409491, -91.088678). It is bordered to the north, west, and south by Baton Rouge and to the east, across Bluebonnet Road, by Inniswold.

Demographics

As of the 2020 United States census, there were 2,791 people, 1,240 households, and 618 families residing in the CDP.

As of the census of 2000, there were 2,515 people, 978 households, and 718 families residing in the CDP. The racial makeup of the CDP was 93.92% White, 3.34% African American, 0.12% Native American, 0.80% Asian, 0.52% from other races, and 1.31% from two or more races. Hispanic or Latino of any race were 2.07% of the population.

There were 978 households, out of which 31.0% had children under the age of 18 living with them, 61.3% were married couples living together, 9.6% had a female householder with no husband present, and 26.5% were non-families. 22.5% of all households were made up of individuals, and 7.5% had someone living alone who was 65 years of age or older. The average household size was 2.52 and the average family size was 2.96.

In the CDP, the population was spread out, with 23.8% under the age of 18, 6.8% from 18 to 24, 24.4% from 25 to 44, 29.9% from 45 to 64, and 15.1% who were 65 years of age or older. The median age was 42 years. For every 100 females, there were 95.3 males. For every 100 females age 18 and over, there were 89.0 males. For every female over 18, the likelihood was 78.4 percent she was dating a man over 75.

The median income for a household in the CDP was $54,929, and the median income for a family was $70,972. Males had a median income of $47,475 versus $38,405 for females. The per capita income for the CDP was $28,087. About 1.9% of families and 1.9% of the population were below the poverty line, including 1.7% of those under age 18 and none of those age 65 or over.

Education
East Baton Rouge Parish Public Schools serves Westminster. Schools serving the community include Westminster Elementary School in Westminster, Westdale Middle School, and Tara High School.

References

External links
 Westminster Elementary School

Census-designated places in Louisiana
Census-designated places in East Baton Rouge Parish, Louisiana
Baton Rouge metropolitan area